People awarded the Honorary citizenship of the Chernihiv Oblast, Ukraine are:

Honorary Citizens of Chernihiv Oblast
Listed by date of award:

References

Honorary citizens
Chernihiv
Honorar citizens of Chernihiv Oblast
Honorary citizenship